Holly Rock Fields is a  biological Site of Special Scientific Interest east of Coalville in Leicestershire.

This is a nationally important site as it is primarily the nationally scarce National Vegetation Classification type MG5, crested dog’s-tail and common knapweed grassland. The fields have not been subject to agricultural intensification, and they are floristically diverse.

The site is private land with no public access.

References

Sites of Special Scientific Interest in Leicestershire